Mixochlorus is a genus of beetles in the family Buprestidae, containing the following species:

 Mixochlorus elegans Fisher, 1925
 Mixochlorus lateralis Waterhouse, 1889
 Mixochlorus suturalis Waterhouse, 1887

References

Buprestidae genera